A startup studio, also known as a startup factory, or a startup foundry, or a venture studio, is a studio-like company that aims at building several companies in succession. This style of business building is referred to as "parallel entrepreneurship".

History
Idealab, founded by Bill Gross in 1996, was one of the first to introduce the 'incubator industry' to the field of technology startups, and has started over 75 companies. Idealab was founded to test many ideas at once and turn the best of them into companies while also attracting the human and financial capital necessary to bring them to the market.

The startup studio trend gained momentum beginning in 2008. As of 2015, there were over 65 startup studios across the world, of which 17 had been built since 2013.

Types

There are several types of startup studio models.

"Builder" studios
A builder startup studio focuses on creating and developing a company, mostly from internal ideas. Notable examples of this model are Atomic, Pioneer Square Labs, Rocket Internet, and eFounders.

Unlike business incubators and accelerators, venture builders generally don't accept applications concerning their portfolio of companies, and the companies instead "pull business ideas from within their own network of resources and assign internal teams to develop them." In the wake of the tech revolution in the early 2000s, the startup studio sector experienced a surge in growth. This led to the emergence of several studios, which modeled themselves after Idealab, seeking to demonstrate the efficacy of their successful model. During this era of technological advancements, leading studios like Rocket and Betaworks established themselves as independent entities by launching scalable businesses to meet the growing demand and adapt to the changing landscape. 

According to VentureBeat, Nova Spivack was "part of the early technologists who pioneered the venture production studio model. He wrote about the model in 2011 at a time when most of its  production elements were still in gestation. Nova actually invented the Venture Production Studio term, calling it a 'new approach to building startups.'"

"Investor" studios

Investor venture studios bring in early-stage external startups and help them grow by providing them both funds and expertise. Studios Betaworks, Colab(Venture Studio), and Science, Inc. fall in this category.

See also
Business incubator
Founder
Startup company
Entrepreneurship
List of venture capital firms
Angel investor

References

Entrepreneurship organizations